Mavis Edna Meadowcroft (1926-2008) was an international lawn bowls competitor for Australia.

She won the triples gold medal and fours silver medal at the 1985 World Outdoor Bowls Championship in Melbourne. 

She was 14-time Stanhope club champion, was selected for the Victoria state side from 1966 to 1988, and was inducted into the Bowls Australia Hall of Fame in 2011.

References

1926 births
2008 deaths
Australian female bowls players
Bowls World Champions